Schenkenzell is a village in the district of Rottweil, in Baden-Württemberg, Germany. The town is twinned with Schenkon in Switzerland.

References

External links
 Schenkenzell pictures

Rottweil (district)